Jesús Hernández Hernández (born 27 October 1991) is a Mexican Paralympic swimmer.

Career
He represented Mexico at the 2016 Summer Paralympics, where he won a bronze medal in the 50 meters backstroke S4 event, and at the 2020 Summer Paralympics, where he won a gold medal in the 150 meters individual medley SM3 event. He also participated at the 2019 Parapan American Games, where he won two gold medals and two silver medals.

References

External links
 Profile  at Olympics.com

1991 births
Living people
Paralympic swimmers of Mexico
People from Irapuato
Swimmers at the 2016 Summer Paralympics
Swimmers at the 2020 Summer Paralympics
Medalists at the 2016 Summer Paralympics
Medalists at the 2019 Parapan American Games
Medalists at the 2020 Summer Paralympics
Medalists at the World Para Swimming Championships
Paralympic bronze medalists for Mexico
Paralympic gold medalists for Mexico
Paralympic medalists in swimming
Sportspeople from Guanajuato
Mexican male backstroke swimmers
Mexican male breaststroke swimmers
Mexican male freestyle swimmers
Mexican male medley swimmers
S4-classified Paralympic swimmers